Wolf's Trail is a 1927 American silent Western film directed by Francis Ford and starring Edmund Cobb, Dixie Lamont and Joseph Bennett.

Synopsis
A Texas Ranger battles against smugglers on the Mexico border. He goes undercover to round up the gang.

Cast
 Edmund Cobb as Captain Tom Grant
 Dixie Lamont as Jane Drew
 Edwin Terry as Simeon Kraft
 Joseph Bennett as Bert Farrel 
 Dynamite the Dog as Dynamite

References

Bibliography
 Langman, Larry. A Guide to Silent Westerns. Greenwood Publishing Group, 1992.

External links
 

1927 films
1927 Western (genre) films
1920s English-language films
Films directed by Francis Ford
Universal Pictures films
Silent American Western (genre) films
1920s American films